The 2009 British Speedway Championship was the 49th edition of the British Speedway Championship. The Final took place on 20 May at Wimborne Road in Poole, England. The Championship was won by Chris Harris, who beat Edward Kennett, Tai Woffinden and Lee Richardson in the final heat. It was the second time Harris had won the title.

Results

The Final 
  Wimborne Road, Poole
 20 May 2009

See also 
 British Speedway Championship

References 

British Speedway Championship
Great Britain
2009 in British sport